S. D. F. C. Nanayakkara was the 34th Surveyor General of Sri Lanka. He was appointed in 1981, succeeding S. J. Munasinghe, and held the office until 1989. He was succeeded by S. T. Herat.

References

N